Cornelia Baxter Barns (September 25, 1888 – November 4, 1941) was an American feminist, socialist, and political cartoonist.

Personal life 
Cornelia Barns was born on September 25, 1888 in Flushing, New York, the oldest of three children born to Charles Edward Barns and Mabel Balston Barns. Charles Barns initially entered law school, but then explored the sciences before launching a career as a newspaperman for the New York Herald. While living in New York, he also earned a reputation as author and poet.  By 1910 the family relocated to Philadelphia, where Charles Barns established himself as theater manager, and Cornelia studied art.

New Woman
As educational opportunities were made more available in the 19th century, women artists became part of professional enterprises, including founding their own art associations. Artwork made by women was considered to be inferior, and to help overcome that stereotype women became "increasingly vocal and confident" in promoting women's work, and thus became part of the emerging image of the educated, modern and freer "New Woman". Artists then, "played crucial roles in representing the New Woman, both by drawing images of the icon and exemplyfying this emerging type through their own lives."

Artist 

Cornelia Barns enrolled at the Pennsylvania Academy of Fine Arts in 1906,  where she became a pupil of William Merritt Chase and John Twachtman. She has been mentioned as an associate of Robert Henri and his Ashcan school. Her work was honored by receiving two Cresson Traveling Scholarships from the Academy, which permitted her first trip to Europe in 1910,  and encouraged another trip abroad in 1913. She exhibited at the Pennsylvania Academy of Fine Arts,  and by 1910 was listed as a painter in the American Art Annual. In her mid-twenties she married Arthur S. Garbett, a British music critic working in Philadelphia.  The couple gave birth to a son in Philadelphia, and is believed to have spent a couple years in New York City.

Max Eastman,  recalled the early days in his assigned role as editor of The Masses, during which the following incident took place around 1913.
 "Cornelia Barns,  an elf-eyed girl with smooth brown hair, turned up with the picture that was brilliantly comic and not like anything else in the world".
Cornelia Barns' artistic style relied on heavy crayon lines and a distinctive comic style in her portrayals of pretentiousness, social privilege, male dominance, and childhood innocence.

In another work Max Eastman wrote,
 "[T]he drawings of Art Young and Cornelia Barns and William Gropper  were of their own intrinsic nature comic.  Captions here were unnecessary, or were at least a supplemental element––often, in fact, supplied by the editors in the office."

"American Salon of Humorists" was a 1915 exhibit held in New York City at the Folsom Galleries.  It was organized by Louis Baury,  and Cornelia Barns was one of the twenty-three featured artists.  She may have been a relative newcomer to the art scene of New York, but she was rising rapidly.

Suffrage and socialism: the New York City years 

From 1913 to 1917 Barns was a frequent contributor to The Masses, a socialist magazine that attracted a highly talented group of writers and artists. For three years, Barns served on its editorial board.
As art historian Rebecca Zurier commented,
"The closest thing to a feminist statement by a woman Masses editor appears in the cartoons of Cornelia Barns, who refrained from any serious social analysis."
When publication of The Masses was suspending following government charges, a new magazine, The Liberator was founded by Max Eastman and Crystal Eastman.  In the February 10, 1918 issue of the New York Call, Cornelia was announced as a contributing editor to The Liberator, along with fellow cartoonist/illustrators Robert Minor, Boardman Robinson and Art Young.  In 1925 the New Masses was announced as "A new radical magazine of arts and letters, without political affiliations or obligations but with sympathy and allegiance unqualifiedly with the international labor movement. . ." Once again, Cornelia Barns was listed as a contributing editor.

Within socialist periodicals, many cartoons by Cornelia Barns pertained to the topic of women's suffrage and gender equality. As might be expected, she also published cartoons in the suffrage magazines including New York City's Woman Voter and the National Woman's Party's Suffragist.  "One Man--One Vote" depicted two immigrant women with young children, juxtaposed with the stare from a male dandy in three-piece suit and walking stick.  Her cover, "Waiting," published in The Suffragist in 1919 is a powerful portrayal of an unending mass of strong-bodied women, two with babies in their arms, holding a lighted torch while waiting for political recognition through suffrage.

In 1918, in its second year of publication, Cornelia Barns and Lou Rogers were listed as art editors for Margaret Sanger's  Birth Control Review.  Her earliest contribution was "We Accuse Society."

California 

In 1920 Cornelia Barns moved to California with her husband, Arthur Selwyn Garbett, and their young son. They settled on a ranch near her parents, who had moved to Morgan Hill,  several years earlier.  Seeking job opportunities, the Garbetts next moved to Berkeley. Garbett became a radio station program director,  later offering his own radio program. He also served as music critic for a San Francisco newspaper.   Cornelia Barns turned mostly to illustration, and provided sketches and covers for Sunset magazine by 1921.   She contributed a feature column for Oakland Tribune, "My City Oakland". Garbett and Barns retired to Los Gatos, California, shortly before Cornelia's death from tuberculosis in November 1941.  It was speculated that years of using  etching acids on zinc plates  in poorly ventilated studios had damaged her lungs. Others have noted that her paternal grandmother and grand aunt both succumbed to the disease.  Following a flood in the family dwelling, few of her original artworks survive.

References

External links 

  The Masses Collection at Michigan State University 

1888 births
1941 deaths
American editorial cartoonists
American women illustrators
Feminist artists
Pennsylvania Academy of the Fine Arts alumni
People from Flushing, Queens
20th-century deaths from tuberculosis
American socialist feminists
Tuberculosis deaths in California
People from Los Gatos, California